Yusuf Maitama Sule University Kano is a Nigerian public university owned by the Kano State Government. It has two campuses: City Campus located in Kano, and the main campus located along General Buhari Way Kofar Ruwa Kano.

History

Kano State Governor Rabiu Kwankwaso set up a technical committee to establish the second Public University in Kano State, after the Kano University of Science and Technology. The committee included Hafiz Abubakar, Muhammad Yahuza Bello, Fatima Batul Mukhtar, Bayero University Kano and Umar Garba. The committee submitted their report to Kwankwaso, who submitted it to the Kano State House of Assembly for their approval. After they passed the bill, the National Universities Commission was contacted for final approval.

Kwankwaso immediately inaugurated an Implementation Committee, which was headed by Professor Hafiz Abubakar. Their task included the appointment of both academic and non-academic staff, and the admission of the original students.

References

External links
Official website

Educational institutions established in 2012
2012 establishments in Nigeria
Universities and colleges in Kano State
Education in Kano
Buildings and structures in Kano
Public universities in Nigeria